Peter Van Hooke (born 6 April 1950) is an English rock drummer and producer with over 350 credits to his name. He was the drummer for the English band Mike + The Mechanics (from 1985 to 1995) and also drummed for Van Morrison's band, Headstone, and Ezio. During the 1980s he co-produced (along with Rod Argent) many of Tanita Tikaram's hits.

Education and early life 
Van Hooke grew up in Stanmore, Middlesex, England and attended Mill Hill School. His schoolmate Chaz Jankel (later of the Blockheads) lived close by, and the two formed The Call of The Wild. This band became the Ric Parnell Independence, featuring the son of bandleader Jack Parnell as vocalist.

Recording career 
Van Hooke played drums on Van Morrison's albums from 1978's Wavelength, Into the Music (1979), Common One (1980), Beautiful Vision (1982), Inarticulate Speech of the Heart (1983), the live album, Live at the Grand Opera House Belfast recorded in 1983 and released in 1984, and The Philosopher's Stone (1998). For some years he also was the drummer in Morrison's touring band which sometimes included two simultaneous drummers. He can also be heard on Louis Clark's album (per-spek-tiv) n. (1979) and Chris de Burgh's albums Into the Light (1986) and Flying Colours (1988).

He was also in demand as a session drummer in the 70s and 80s, and was one of the first UK drummers to own a set of Syndrums, initially coming to prominence on the Marshall Hain hit "Dancing in the City". He joined Stackridge in time to play on their 1976 album Mr. Mick, though the band broke up not long after.

Production career 
Van Hooke created and co-produced the television series Live from Abbey Road which was aired on Channel 4 in between 2006 and 2009 in the United Kingdom.

He co-produced his former Mike + the Mechanics bandmate Paul Carrack's album A Different Hat (2010), on which Carrack performed with the Royal Philharmonic Orchestra.

He also co-produced with Rod Argent Soraya's debut album On Nights Like This (Titled in Spanish: "En Esta Noche") in 1995 and her second album Wall Of Smiles (Titled in Spanish: "Torre De Marfil") in 1997.

Personal life 
Van Hooke is married and has three sons.

Collaborations 
With Joshua Kadison
 Painted Desert Serenade (Capitol Records, 1993)

With Sally Oldfield
 Strange Day in Berlin (Bronze, 1983)

With Jennifer Rush
 Wings of Desire (Columbia Records, 1989)

References

External links
 

1950 births
Living people
People from Stanmore
English rock drummers
British male drummers
English record producers
Van Morrison
English session musicians
English people of Dutch descent
Mike + The Mechanics members
Stackridge members